This is a comprehensive list of notable stoner rock bands. It includes any musical groups that have incorporated the genre into their music at some point in their career.

A
 Abramis Brama

 Acid King

 Acrimony

 All Them Witches

 Arctic Monkeys

 The Atomic Bitchwax

B
 Beaver

 Big Scenic Nowhere

 Black Moth

 Black Mountain

 Black NASA

 Black River

 Black Spiders

 Black Sabbath

 Blood Duster

 Bongripper

 Bongzilla

 Boris

 Brant Bjork and the Bros

 Brant Bjork and the Low Desert Punk Band

C
 Cathedral

 Ché

 Chrome Locust

 Colour Haze

 Corrosion of Conformity

 CKY

 Clutch

D
 Dead Meadow

 Demon Cleaner

 Dern Rutlidge

 The Desert Sessions

 Down

 Dozer

 Dragpipe

 Drunk Horse

E
 Earthless

 Earthlings?

 Electric Wizard

 Elder

 Eyehategod

F
 Far from Alaska

 Fatso Jetson

 Feast

 Fireball Ministry

 Fort

 Fu Manchu

G
 Goatsnake

 Greenleaf

H
 The Hanging Tree

 Hermano

 High on Fire

 Holy Mountain

I
 Indian Handcrafts

 Iron Monkey

K
 Karma to Burn

 The Kings of Frog Island

 Kylesa

 Kyuss

L
 Los Natas

 Lowrider

M
 Mannhai

 Mars Red Sky

 Masters of Reality

 Mastodon

 Melvins

 Mondo Generator

 Monkey3

 Monster Magnet

 The Mushroom River Band

N
 Nebula

 Neurosis

 Nightstalker

O
 The Obsessed

 Orange Goblin

P
 Part Chimp

 Pod People

 Pulled Apart by Horses

Q
 Qoph

 Queens of the Stone Age

 The Quill

R
 Red Aim

 Red Fang

 Rollerball

 Royal Blood

S
 Saint Vitus

 Sasquatch

 Sheavy

 Sir Lord Baltimore

 Sixty Watt Shaman

 Sleep

 Sleepy Sun

 Slift

 Slo Burn

 Somali Yacht Club

 Sons of Alpha Centauri

 Sons of Otis

 Spirit Caravan

 Spiritual Beggars

 Stonefield

 Stöner

 The Sword

T
 Terra Firma

 Torche

 Trouble

 Truckfighters

 True Widow

U
 Ufomammut

 Uncle Acid & the Deadbeats

 Unida

V
 Vista Chino

W
 Waxy

 Weedeater

 White Miles

 Windhand

 Winnebago Deal

 Witch

 Wolfmother

Y
 Yawning Man

 Year Long Disaster

 Yob

 Youngblood Supercult

#
 1000mods

 35007

References 

Stoner rock musical groups
Stoner rock
Lists of rock music groups